Mayor's Commission on African and Asian Heritage (also known as MCAAH) was established by Ken Livingstone when he was Mayor of London. MCAAH was convened from August 2003 to June 2004 and was chaired by Dame Jocelyn Barrow. More than 20 practitioners, policy-makers and academics were appointed as commissioners and met around a programme of 15 sessions across London. The MCAAH's report, Delivering Shared Heritage (July 2005), was launched at the Victoria and Albert Museum.

A key recommendation of MCAAH was the establishment of The Heritage Task Force, set up when Boris Johnson was Mayor of London. The Task Force had a much reduced profile and there was a significant change in language and emphasis. The Task Force published Embedding Shared Heritage: The Heritage Diversity Task Force Report in November 2009.

Commissioners were:

 Colin Prescod
 Irna Mumtaz Qureshi
 Hakim Adi 
 Caroline Bressey 
 Hilary Carty 
 Augustus Casely-Hayford
 Stella Dadzie
 Morgan Dalphinis 
 Melissa D'Mello 
 Lee Hong Fulton 
 Shreela Ghosh 
 Raminder Kaur
 Chandan Mahal 
 Ken Martindale
 Maxine Miller 
 Heidi Safia Mirza
 Ron Ramdin 
 Sajid Rizvi 
 Patrick Vernon

See also 
Commission for Diversity in the Public Realm

References

Further reading 

 Delivering Shared Heritage: The Mayor's Commission on African and Asian Heritage (July 2005), Greater London Authority  
 Embedding Shared Heritage: The Heritage Diversity Task Force Report (November 2009), Greater London Authority 

2003 establishments in the United Kingdom
2003 in London
History of London